

The Levasseur PL.5 was a carrier-based fighter produced in France in the late 1920s, in response to the 1924 AMBC.2 (two seat carrier based fighter) specification issued by the Service Technique de l'Aéronautique (STAé). It was a conventional, single-bay sesquiplane that carried a crew of two in tandem, open cockpits. Like other Levasseur naval designs of the day,  it incorporated several safety features in case of ditching at sea. Apart from small floats attached directly to the undersides of the lower wing, the main units of the fixed, tail-skid undercarriage could be jettisoned in flight, and the underside of the fuselage was given a boat-like shape and made watertight.

Four prototypes were evaluated by the Aéronavale in 1924, and following successful trials, an order for 20 machines was placed to equip the aircraft carrier Béarn, enterring service in 1927.

Six examples of a trainer version with a lower-powered engine were purchased as the PL.9.

Variants
Levasseur V AM B-C.2 3x prototypes with  Hispano-Suiza 12Ha engine
Levasseur V C.2B1x prototype with Renault 12Kd engine.
PL.5production version with  Lorraine-Dietrich 12Eb engine; 20 built.
PL.9trainer version with a  Hispano-Suiza 8Se V-8 engine; 6 built.

Operators
 
 Aéronavale
 Escadrille 7C1

Specifications (V AM C.2B)

See also

References

1920s French fighter aircraft
Carrier-based aircraft
Levasseur aircraft
Sesquiplanes
Single-engined tractor aircraft
Aircraft first flown in 1924